Television in Latin America currently includes more than 1,500 television stations and more than 60 million TV sets throughout the 20 countries that constitute Latin America. Due to economic and political problems television networks in some countries of this region have developed less than the North American and European networks, for instance. In other countries like Colombia or Chile, television broadcasting has historically been public-broadcast dominated until the 1990s. The largest commercial television groups are Mexico-based Televisa, Brazil-based Globo and Canada-based Canwest Latin American Group. Due to the shared language of Spanish by two thirds of Latin Americans a lot of programmes and broadcasters operate throughout the region, offering both United States television (often dubbed into Spanish) and Spanish-language television.

Argentina 

El Trece
Telefe
El Nueve
TV Pública
América TV
Net TV
TyC Sports

Bolivia 

 Activa TV
 ATB
 Bolivia TV
 Bolivisión
 Cadena A
 Red Uno
 RTP
 Unitel

Brazil 

Globo (since 1965)
RecordTV (since 1953)
Bandeirantes (since 1967)
SBT (since 1981)
RedeTV! (since 1999)
Cultura (since 1969)
TV Brasil (since 2007)
Gazeta (since 1970)

Chile 

TV+ (since 1957), channel 5
Canal 13 (since 1959), channel 13
Chilevisión (since 1960, under different names), channel 11
TVN (since 1969), channel 7
Mega (since 1990), channel 9
La Red (since 1991), channel 4
Telecanal (since 2005), channel 2

Colombia 

Caracol TV
RCN TV
Canal 1

Costa Rica 
 Canal 38 Estereo
 Conexion TV
 Repretel 4
 Repretel 6
 Repretel 9 (discontinued)
 Repretel 11
 Sinart
 Teletica
 UCR TV

Cuba

Dominican Republic 
 TeleAntillas - Channel 2
 Corporación Estatal de Radio y Television CERTV - Channel 4 Public TV Station
 Telemicro
 Antena Latina - Channel 7
 Color Visión
 Telesistema Dominicano - Channel 11
 Telecentro - Channel 13
 Sport Vision - Channel 35
 Cana TV - Popular local morning shows, news coverage, cooking shows and family entertainment
 Vegateve
 CDN 37
 SuperCanal

Ecuador

El Salvador 

Ágape TV Canal 8
Canal 10
Canal 12
Canal 33
Megavisión (Channels 15, 19 and 21)
Telecorporacion Salvadoreña (Channels 2, 4, 6 and TCS+)

Guatemala 
VHF
 Canal 3 (Albavision)
 Canal 5 TV Maya
 Canal 7 Televisiete (Albavision)
 Canal 9 TV Congreso (off air)
 Canal 11 Tele-Once (Albavision)
 Canal 13 Trecevisión (Albavision)
UHF
 Canal 19 Albanoticias -mirrored- (Albavision)
 Canal 21 Enlace
 Canal 23 Albanoticias (Albavision)
 Canal 25 Guatevision
 Canal 27 El canal de la Esperanza
 Canal 31 TV Azteca Guatemala
 Canal 33 TV USAC
 Canal 35 TV Azteca Guatemala
 Canal 37 Telecentro -mirrored- (Albavision)
 Canal 41 Telecentro (Albavision)
 Canal 61 Enlace Juvenil
 Canal 63 Televisión Arquidiocesana
 Canal 65 Family TV
Satellite
 18-50 TV
 Canal Antigua
 Vea Canal
 Guatevision

Guatemala doesn't have a digital terrestrial standard yet, but it seems that ISDB-T will be the standard.
Albavision broadcast in the ATSC format for about four years on channel 19 HDTV, but is now back to analog transmission on that same frequency.

Honduras 

Globo Tv Honduras
Canal 3 Quimistan
Televicentro
Canal 6 (Honduras)
Teleceiba 7
Sulavision
TEN (Television Educacional de Honduras)
Villavision
Canal 11
Yojoa Tv
Telemas Canal 13

Mexico 

Televisa
TV Azteca
Canal Once Mexico
Telehit
Gala TV
FOROtv
Cadenatres

Nicaragua

Panama

Paraguay 

Trece 
LaTele 
Paravisión 
SNT 
Telefuturo
Unicanal 
Paraguay TV

Peru

National networks
Frequency numbers for Lima in analog TV. (most are also available on DTT)

Channel 2 Latina
Channel 4 América TV
Channel 5 Panamericana TV
Channel 7 TV Perú
Channel 9 ATV
Channel 11 
Channel 13 Global TV

Pay TV
National channels from Telefónica's Cable Mágico, the country's most popular operator.

Plus TV
Canal N
Movistar Deportes

Puerto Rico 

Puerto Rico follows USA TV Code system

Telemundo Puerto Rico (WKAQ)
Sistema TV (WMTJ)
WAPA TV (WAPA)
Puerto Rico TV (WIPR) government
TeleIsla (WSTE)
Univisión PR (WLII)
Canal de Vídeos (WTCV)
TeleOro (WORO) religious-catholic church
New conscience network (WUJA (religious)
La cadena del milagro WCCV RELIGIOUS
América Tevé (WJPX)
Único TV pr WECN
Bayamon Christian network WDWL RELIGIOUS
AMÉRICA TE VE PR (WIRS)
Canal iglesia de dios Pentecostal WIDP RELIGIOUS
VMAX (WRFB)
Accu weather WMEI
WAPA 2 (sports)
Punto dos

Uruguay 

Canal 4 (Montevideo)
Canal 10 (Montevideo)
Teledoce
La Red
TNU
TV Ciudad

Venezuela

See also
 Latin American television awards

References

Latin American media